The list of speakers hosted by The Economic Club of Washington, D.C. since its founding in 1986 are as follows (in chronological order):

References

External links 

 

501(c)(3) organizations
Non-profit organizations based in Washington, D.C.
Economic Club speakers